Debarwa Subregion is a subregion in the southern Debub region (Zoba Debarwa) of Eritrea. Its capital lies at Debarwa.

References

Awate.com: Martyr Statistics

Southern Region (Eritrea)
Subregions of Eritrea